Draugen may refer to:

 Draugen oil field, an oil field in the Norwegian Sea
 Draugen (video game), a 2019 video game developed by Ragnar Tørnquist and Red Thread Games
 ST Draugen, a Norwegian tug sunk on July 15, 1940
 Draugen, Norwegian singular of Draug, undead creatures from Norse mythology
 Draugen, stage name of Joel Andersson, ex-drummer of Swedish black metal band Dark Funeral
 Draugen, a 2005 album by Norwegian black metal act Burzum
 "Draugen", a track on the album Älvefärd by the Swedish folk metal band Otyg
 "Draugen", a track on the album Nattväsen by the Swedish Viking metal band Månegarm